Michel de Roy (13 December 1948 – 15 October 2021) was a French writer.

Biography
After working as a bartender and shopkeeper, de Roy became a police officer and private detective. In 1985, he published his first novel, titled Sûreté urbaine. In 1986, he received the Prix du Quai des Orfèvres. He then continued a career as a writer and published over forty novels, as well as tales and short stories.

Michel de Roy died in La Grande-Motte on 15 October 2021 at the age of 72.

Works

Novels

Rémy de Choli series
Crime assuré (2003)
Meurtre en sous-traitance (2004)
64, boulevard Gambetta (2005)
Écarts de conduite (2006)
Y'a pas de raison (2009)
Séquestration (2011)
Au troisième coup de maillet (2014)
Sévices compris (2018)

Other novels
Sûreté urbaine (1985)
Dernier Casse (1988)
eBanditisme sans frontières (1989)
Contes du Midi (1990)
Un tueur peut en cacher un autre (1991)
Fric, drogue, sexe, crime, racket, haute sécurité ? (1994)
Écarts de conduite (2006)
Un petit dernier pour la route (2006)
De sac et de corde (2007)
Sans issue (2009)
Y a pas de raison (2010)
Séquestration (2011)
Pour solde de tout compte (2012)
Voyage en première classe (2012)
Au troisième coup de maillet (2014)
La Rue en trompe-l’œil (2015)
Sévices compris (2016)
Le Cadavre est dans l'ascenseur (2018)
Vol programmé (2020)

Other works
Vous écrivez ? Alors, attention : guide pratique à l'usage des écrivains débutants ou confirmés (2017)

References

1948 births
2021 deaths
20th-century French male writers
People from Orange, Vaucluse
French male novelists
20th-century French novelists
Bartenders
French male short story writers
20th-century French short story writers
French police officers
Police detectives